Ikūn-pî-Ištar, meaning “Ištar's word has come true”  and inscribed [i-k]u-un-pi4-eš4-tár, was a Mesopotamian king (ca. 1825–1799 BC short chronology) of uncertain jurisdiction, Jakobson suggested Uruk, presumably preceding Sîn-kāšid, contemporary with the latter part of the 1st Dynasty of Isin.

History

He appears on two variant Sumerian King List fragments, one of which has him followed by Sumu-abum (ca. 1830—1817 BC) of Babylon, the other sandwiched between the reigns of Erra-Imittī (ca. 1805–1799 BC) and Enlil-bāni (ca. 1798 BC – 1775 BC) the kings of Isin. This gives his reign as six months or a year depending on which variant is cited. Sūmû-El, the king of Larsa’s fifth year name (ca 1825 BC) celebrates a victory over the forces of Uruk during a time when it was independent. A haematite cylinder seal in the British Museum attests to a servant of pî-Ištar, which may be an abbreviation of this king’s name. A satukku (sá-dug4), or offering, text from Nippur is the only exemplar of a text giving his year name and was found among a cache of cuneiform tablets relating to the temple of Ninurta dating from Lipit-Enlil’s first year (ca. 1798 BC) onward, after which the city remained under the control of the kings of Isin for a seventy five year period. His hegemony over this city must therefore have preceded that of Lipit-Enlil.

Inscriptions

References

19th-century BC rulers